Mussa Danilovich Tsalikov (or Musa Danilbekovich Tsalikov) (born in 1937) is a Russian football player and coach.

He is the first coach of Valery Gazzaev.

External links
 

1937 births
Living people
Soviet footballers
FC Sibir Novosibirsk players
FC Spartak Vladikavkaz players
Soviet football managers
FC Spartak Vladikavkaz managers
Association football midfielders
FC Dynamo Makhachkala players
Sportspeople from Vladikavkaz